A pepperette is a sausage-like food that is usually made from ground meat, with turkey, beef, and pork being the most common varieties. The meat is usually mixed with spices and comes ready to eat without any type of cooking or preparation. Pepperettes may or may not have to be refrigerated depending on the specific type and how it was made.

Pepperettes can come in a variety of shapes and sizes, however the most common types closely resemble a narrow shriveled-up hot dog. Peperami is an example of pepperette.

The term "Pepperettes" is a trademark of the Canadian company Schneiders, a nationally-known meat company established in 1890 in Kitchener, Ontario.

References

Sausages
Snack foods